The tricolored parrotfinch (Erythrura tricolor) is a species of estrildid finch found in Timor and the southern Moluccas. It has an estimated global extent of occurrence of 20,000 to 50,000 km2.

It is found in subtropical/tropical dry forest and dry savannah. The IUCN has classified the species as being of least concern.

Origin
Origin and phylogeny has been obtained by Antonio Arnaiz-Villena et al.. Estrildinae may have originated in India and dispersed thereafter (towards Africa and Pacific Ocean habitats).

References

External links
 Species factsheet - BirdLife International

tricoloured parrotfinch
Birds of Timor
Birds of the Maluku Islands
tricolored parrotfinch
Taxa named by Louis Jean Pierre Vieillot